Bojan Magazin (born 12 December 1976) is a Bosnian football manager and former player.

Playing career

Club
Born in Konjic, SR Bosnia and Herzegovina, back then still within Yugoslavia, Magazin played as midfielder and started his career with local side FK Igman Konjic, but he had to leave because of the start of the Bosnian War when he was only 16. He moved to FR Yugoslavia and there he played with top-league sides FK Sutjeska Nikšić, FK Vojvodina, and FK Mogren.   He will then have a new spell with FK Sutjeska Nikšić, and spells with FK Mladost Gacko, On May 26, 2004, he was among the heroes of the 2003–04 Bosnian Cup final when his club, Modriča, won on penalties the favorites, FK Borac Banja Luka.  FK Budućnost Podgorica, FK Modriča and FK Leotar.  He started the 2007–08 season by playing with OFK Grbalj in the Montenegrin First League.  On January 21, 2008, Magazin signed a year and a half contract with FK Sarajevo, FK Leotar and in summer 2010 he left Leotar and joined FK Modriča where he will play until summer 2014.

He scored one goal with FK Sutjeska Nikšić in the 1999–2000 First League of FR Yugoslavia.  Then he made 23 appearances in the 2001–02 First League of FR Yugoslavia and 1 appearance in the 2002–03 First League of Serbia and Montenegro with FK Sutjeska Nikšić.  Bojan Magazin scored one goal with Budućnost in the 2004–05 First League of Serbia and Montenegro.  In the same season, 2004–05, he scored one goal with FK Modriča in the Bosnian Premier League.  He made 25 appearances in the 2008–09 season, and 19 appearances and scored 4 goals with FK Leotar in the 2009–10 Premier League of Bosnia and Herzegovina.

Managerial career
After retiring, Magazin became a manager. On September 29, 2014, he was appointed manager of Tekstilac Derventa in the 2014–15 First League of the Republika Srpska. After Tekstilac, he also managed Orašje and Zvijezda Gradačac.

Honours

Player
Modriča
Bosnian Cup: 2003–04

References

1976 births
Living people
People from Konjic
Serbs of Bosnia and Herzegovina
Association football midfielders
Bosnia and Herzegovina footballers
FK Igman Konjic players
FK Sutjeska Nikšić players
FK Vojvodina players
FK Mogren players
FK Mladost Gacko players
FK Modriča players
FK Budućnost Podgorica players
FK Leotar players
OFK Grbalj players
FK Sarajevo players
First League of Serbia and Montenegro players
Montenegrin First League players
Premier League of Bosnia and Herzegovina players
Bosnia and Herzegovina expatriate footballers
Expatriate footballers in Serbia and Montenegro
Bosnia and Herzegovina expatriate sportspeople in Serbia and Montenegro
Expatriate footballers in Montenegro
Bosnia and Herzegovina expatriate sportspeople in Montenegro
Bosnia and Herzegovina football managers
HNK Orašje managers
NK Zvijezda Gradačac managers